Tullycommon Wedge Tomb is a wedge-shaped gallery grave and National Monument located in The Burren region of County Clare, Ireland.

Location
Tullycommon wedge tomb is located in the eponymous townland in Kilnaboy parish, 1.8 km (1.1 mi) southeast of Carran, between Knockaun Fort (with souterrain) and a caher.

History
Wedge tombs of this kind were built in Ireland in the late Neolithic and early Bronze Age, c. 2500–2000 BC.

Description
Tullycommon Wedge Tomb is aligned approx SW-NE, receiving the light of the setting sun. It is a box-like structure with two long sidestones and a capstone. The gallery is just 1.7 m in length and 80 cm high.

At the rear two shorter side stones flank the back stone. Just beyond the end of the chamber is an outer back stone.

References

External links
 Tullycommon Wedge Tomb at the Clare County Library

National Monuments in County Clare
Archaeological sites in County Clare
Tombs in the Republic of Ireland